Plurale is an album by Italian singer Mina, distributed back to back with album Singolare.

Track listing 
 Intro - 2:26 -  (Recording dialogues during rehearsals) 
 Moonlight Serenade - 4:01 -  (Glenn Miller-Mitchell Parish) 
 C'è un uomo in mezzo al mare - 2:29 -  (Nino Giuseppe Rastelli-Dino Olivieri) 
 My Love  - 4:16 -  (Paul McCartney-Linda McCartney) 
 Il testamento del capitano - 3:47 -  (Tradizionale-Gianni Ferrio) 
 El porompompero - 3:16 -  (José Antonio Ochaíta-Xandro Valerio-Juan Solano Pedrero) 
 Michelle - 5:36 -  (John Lennon-Paul McCartney) 
 Pennsylvania 6-5000 - 2:57 -  (Carl Sigman-Jerry Gray) 
 Scettico Blues - 3:30 -  (Dino Rulli-T. De Filippis) 
 Mood Indigo - 3:14 -  (Duke Ellington-Barney Bigard-Irving Mills) 
 Good Evening Friends - 0:08 -  (Gianni Ferrio)

Live Performance 

El porompompero :

Live Version -  Mina Live '78

Michelle:
Italian version Live TV '67, album Signori... Mina! vol. 1

Trivia
An album titled Mina was released for the English market in 1978 which included the six English songs founds in Singulare as well as English versions of others Mina's songs translated by Norman Newell. The album cover of Mina was a cropped image of the one on Singulare.

References 

1976 albums
Mina (Italian singer) albums